Alain Colas (16 September 1943 – 16 November 1978) was a French sailor, the first to complete a solitary round-the-world race in a multihull. He met Éric Tabarly in Sydney in 1967, and bought Pen Duick IV from him in 1970, and won the "Transat" in 1972. In 1972, he started the construction of a 72m (236 feet) 4 masted monohull for the 1976 "Transat".

He broke his right ankle, underwent 22 surgeries, and got back on his feet for the solitary transatlantic race. Éric Tabarly won, and Alain Colas arrived 2nd, but was classed 5th. On 5 November 1978, he took part in his last race, the first Route du Rhum. On 16 November 1978, as he passed the Azores, he sent his last radio message saying that everything was alright and sailing well. Neither his boat Manureva nor his body were ever found.

See also 
List of people who disappeared mysteriously at sea
Manureva (Pen Duick IV)
Phocéa
INA (French video archives) on Alain Colas

References 

1942 births
1970s missing person cases
1978 deaths
French sailors
Missing people
People lost at sea
Single-handed circumnavigating sailors